Derbyshire County Cricket Club in 1978 was the cricket season when the English club Derbyshire had been playing for one hundred and seven years. They reached the final of the Benson & Hedges Cup. In the County Championship, they won three matches to finish fourteenth in their seventy fourth season in the Championship. They came eighth in the John Player League and did not progress beyond round 2 in the Gillette Cup.

1978 season

Derbyshire reached the final of the Benson and Hedges Cup, losing to Kent. They played twenty two matches in the County Championship, one against Cambridge University and one against the touring Pakistanis. They won three first class matches overall, all in the Championship. In the Sunday league Derbyshire won six of the first eight matches but then lost the remaining six that were played. They were knocked out in the second round of the Gillette Cup.
 
Eddie Barlow was in his second season as captain. A successful run in the Benson and Hedges cup saw Alan Hill as top scorer overall and Eddie Barlow taking most wickets overall. However, in the first class game alone, Peter Kirsten was top scorer and Mike Hendrick took most wickets.

Matches

First Class

John Player League

Gillette Cup

Benson and Hedges Cup

Statistics

Competition batting averages

Competition bowling averages

Wicket Keeping
Bob Taylor 
County Championship Catches 24, Stumping 2
John Player League Catches 10, Stumping 1
Gillette Cup Catches 2, Stumping 1
Benson and Hedges Cup Catches 10, Stumping 1

See also
Derbyshire County Cricket Club seasons
1978 English cricket season

References

1978 in English cricket
Derbyshire County Cricket Club seasons